Coffeeville is a town in Clarke County, Alabama, United States. At the 2020 census, the population was 263.

History
The town of Coffeeville was incorporated in 1817.

In 1892, Coffeeville was the site for a violent confrontation around economic and racial divides that later became known as the Mitcham War.

In 1939, racial violence in Coffeeville was brought to the attention of President Franklin D. Roosevelt after a near-lynching in which the mayor of Coffeeville was complicit.

Geography
Coffeeville is located in northwestern Clarke County at 31°45'40.543" North, 88°5'20.940" West (31.761262, -88.089150), on high ground on the east side of the Tombigbee River.

Demographics

As of the census of 2000, there were 360 people, 165 households, and 97 families residing in the town. The racial makeup of the town was 61.11% White and 38.89% Black or African American.

There were 165 households, out of which 22.4% had children under the age of 18 living with them, 40.6% were married couples living together, 13.9% had a female householder with no husband present, and 41.2% were non-families. 40.6% of all households were made up of individuals, and 21.2% had someone living alone who was 65 years of age or older. The average household size was 2.18 and the average family size was 2.95.

In the town, the population was spread out, with 23.9% under the age of 18, 6.9% from 18 to 24, 23.1% from 25 to 44, 25.3% from 45 to 64, and 20.8% who were 65 years of age or older. The median age was 42 years. For every 100 females, there were 80.9 males. For every 100 females age 18 and over, there were 80.3 males.

The median income for a household in the town was $19,545, and the median income for a family was $33,125. Males had a median income of $29,000 versus $17,500 for females. The per capita income for the town was $16,886. About 18.8% of families and 25.6% of the population were below the poverty line, including 42.2% of those under age 18 and 19.7% of those age 65 or over.

Notable people
Tom Long, professional baseball outfielder
Ashton Shepherd, singer
Willie J. Slater, head football coach for the Tuskegee University Golden Tigers

References

Towns in Clarke County, Alabama
Towns in Alabama